Saber Hussain (born November 5, 1981) is a Saudi football player who plays a striker.

References

1981 births
Living people
Saudi Arabian footballers
Ohod Club players
Al-Taawoun FC players
Al-Hazem F.C. players
Al-Tai FC players
Al-Faisaly FC players
Al-Ansar FC (Medina) players
Al-Majd Club players
Saudi First Division League players
Saudi Professional League players
Saudi Second Division players
Saudi Fourth Division players
Association football forwards